Berenty is a town and commune in Madagascar. It belongs to the district of Ankazoabo, which is a part of Atsimo-Andrefana Region. The population of the commune was estimated to be approximately 1,000 in 2001 commune census.

Primary and junior level secondary education are available in town. The majority 50% of the population of the commune are farmers, while an additional 49% receives their livelihood from raising livestock. The most important crop is rice, while other important products are peanuts and cassava.  Services provide employment for 1% of the population.

See also
 Berenty Reserve

References and notes 

Populated places in Atsimo-Andrefana